Roaring River is an unincorporated community in Wilkes County, North Carolina, United States. Roaring River has a post office with ZIP code 28669.

Roaring River, a tributary of the Yadkin River, joins here.

References

Unincorporated communities in Wilkes County, North Carolina
Unincorporated communities in North Carolina